Leopold Bellak (1916–2000) was a psychologist, psychoanalyst, and psychiatrist who pioneered the Children's Apperception Test (CAT). He also collaborated on the Thematic Apperception Test (TAT), on clinical psychological assessments, and pioneered the understanding of ADHD (Attention Deficit Hyperactivity Disorder) as being a genetic disorder. Dr. Bellak created the 67-year-old publishing house, CPS Publishing LLC.

He was born in Vienna, Austria and as a refugee moved  to the United States in 1939. In addition, he was the author of many books and manuscripts. His tests and books are used in universities, and by clinicians globally.

He received the APA Award for Distinguished Professional Contributions to Applied Research in 1979. He received the Bruno Klopfer Award in 1991. He was awarded these and many others for his many achievements.

References 

20th-century American psychologists
1916 births
2000 deaths
Emigrants from Austria after the Anschluss
Austrian emigrants to the United States
American psychologists